This is a list of notable events in music that took place in the year 1964.

Specific locations
1964 in British music
1964 in Norwegian music

Specific genres
1964 in country music
1964 in jazz

Events
January 1 – Top of the Pops is broadcast for the first time, on BBC television in the U.K.
January 3 – Footage of the Beatles performing a concert in Bournemouth, England is shown on The Jack Paar Show.
January 10 – Introducing... The Beatles, the first album by The Beatles to be released in the United States, comes out on Chicago's Vee-Jay Records, preceding Capitol Records' release of Meet the Beatles!, scheduled for January 20.
January 13 – Bob Dylan's The Times They Are a-Changin' is released on Columbia Records.
January 15 – Vee Jay Records files a lawsuit against Capitol Records and Swan Records over manufacturing and distribution rights to Beatles albums. On April 9, Capitol Records is granted an injunction restraining Vee Jay Records from further manufacturing, distributing or advertising recordings by the Beatles.
January 18 – The Beatles appear on the Billboard magazine charts for the first time.

January 25 – The late John F. Kennedy becomes the first President credited with a Top 10 album after Dickie Goodman releases John F. Kennedy: The Presidential Years 1960–1963. The following week a second album credited to the late President would also hit the Top 10, giving Kennedy two posthumous albums simultaneously in the Top 10.  
February 1 – Indiana Governor Matthew E. Welsh declares the song "Louie Louie" by The Kingsmen pornographic. He requests that the Indiana Broadcasters Association ban the record. Governor Welsh claimed that hearing the song made his "ears tingle." Publisher Max Firetag offers $1,000 to anyone that can find anything "suggestive" in the song's lyrics.
February 7 – The Beatles arrive in the United States and are greeted by thousands of screaming fans at New York's Kennedy Airport.
February 9 – The Beatles perform on The Ed Sullivan Show, which breaks television ratings records.
February 12 – Anna Moffo collapses onstage at Covent Garden in the first act of Rigoletto, and her part is taken over, after a delay of 45 minutes, by Welsh soprano Elizabeth Vaughan.
February 16 – The Beatles appear on The Ed Sullivan Show.
February 22 – Plácido Domingo makes his international breakthrough at the première of Ginastera's Don Rodrigo in New York City.
February 23 
The Beatles appear on The Ed Sullivan Show.
João Carlos Martins suddenly breaks off a performance in the middle of the second movement of Beethoven's Third Piano Concerto with the City of Birmingham Symphony Orchestra at Birmingham Town Hall due to an attack of appendicitis.
March 1
Capitol Records is bombarded with requests for heavyweight boxing champion Cassius Clay's album, I Am the Greatest, following Clay's defeat of Sonny Liston on February 25 and his announcement two days later that he had converted to Islam. (On March 6 would come the announcement that he would adopt the name Muhammad Ali.)
American premiere of Karlheinz Stockhausen's Momente, by Martina Arroyo (soprano), the Crane Collegiate Singers of SUNY Potsdam (Brock McElheran, chorus master), and members of the Buffalo Philharmonic Orchestra (Lukas Foss, music director), conducted by the composer, in Kleinhans Music Hall in Buffalo, New York.
March 6 – Elvis Presley's 14th motion picture, Kissin' Cousins is released to theaters.
March 14 – Billboard Magazine reports that sales of Beatles records make up 60% of the entire singles market.
March 16 – Disc jockey Alan Freed is charged with tax evasion.
March 21 – Italy wins the 9th Eurovision Song Contest, held in the Tivoli Concert Hall, Copenhagen, with the song "Non ho l'età", sung by 16-year-old Gigliola Cinquetti.
March 24 – John Lennon's first book, In His Own Write is published.
March 27 – The Beatles occupy the top six spots on the Australian pop chart.
March 28 – Wax likenesses of The Beatles are put on display in London's Madame Tussauds Wax Museum. The Beatles are the first pop stars to be displayed at the museum.
April – Drummer Keith Moon joins The Who.
April 4 – The Beatles occupy all five top positions on Billboard's Hot 100 with their singles "Can't Buy Me Love", "Twist and Shout", "She Loves You", "I Want to Hold Your Hand", and "Please Please Me".
April 11 – The Beatles hold 14 positions on the Billboard Hot 100 chart. Previously, the highest number of concurrent singles by one artist on the Hot 100 was nine by Elvis Presley, December 19, 1956.
April 16 – The Rolling Stones release their eponymous début album.
May 2 – In the United States, The Beatles' Second Album climbs to the #1 spot on the LP charts in only its second week of release.
May 12 – The 6th Annual Grammy Awards are held in Chicago, Los Angeles and New York. Henry Mancini wins the most awards with four, including both Record of the Year and Song of the Year for the song "Days of Wine and Roses". Barbra Streisand's The Barbra Streisand Album wins Album of the Year, while Ward Swingle of The Swingle Singers wins Best New Artist.
May 20 – Judy Garland makes headlines after a disastrous concert in Melbourne, Australia
June
 During a performance at the Railway, Pete Townshend of The Who accidentally breaks the head of his guitar on the low ceiling above the stage. This incident marks the start of auto-destructive art by destroying guitars and drums on stage.
 Marianne Faithfull's singing career begins with the release of her single "As Tears Go By" written by members of The Rolling Stones.
June 5 – The Rolling Stones start their first U.S. tour.
July 3 – With their new manager Peter Meaden, The Who release their first single "Zoot Suit"/"I'm the Face" under the name The High Numbers in an attempt to appeal to a mod audience. It fails to reach the top 50 and the band reverts to calling themselves The Who.
July 6 – The Beatles' first film, A Hard Day's Night, is released.
July 10
The album of A Hard Day's Night is released in the U.K. All tracks are written by Lennon and McCartney.
More than 300 people are injured in Liverpool when a crowd of some 150,000 people welcome The Beatles back to their home city.
August 2 – The wreckage of the plane piloted by Jim Reeves is found near Brentwood, Tennessee, 42 hours after it crashed.  There are no survivors.
August 8 – Bob Dylan releases his fourth album, Another Side of Bob Dylan.
August 17 – Indiana University Opera Theater presents Turandot at the New York World's Fair featuring newly retired Metropolitan Opera soprano Margaret Harshaw, a member of the voice faculty, in the title role.
August 19 – The Beatles start their second visit to, and first nationwide tour of, the United States with a concert at the Cow Palace in Daly City, California, before more than 17,000 fans. 
August 22 – The Supremes reach #1 on the Billboard Hot 100 chart with the first of five successive number one hits, "Where Did Our Love Go".
August 26 – The Kinks release their iconic single "You Really Got Me".
September 8 – The American premiere of Karlheinz Stockhausen's Originale at Judson Hall in New York City is picketed by a group calling themselves Action Against Cultural Imperialism.
September 16 – Shindig! premieres on ABC.
September 21 – The China Conservatory of Music is established in Beijing.
September 22 – Fiddler on the Roof opens on Broadway.
October – Dr. Robert Moog demonstrates his prototype synthesizers.
October 19 – Simon & Garfunkel release their debut album, Wednesday Morning, 3 A.M., their first for Columbia Records, which is a total flop at this time. After release of their second album, Sounds of Silence, in 1966, it hits #30 on the Billboard charts.
October 24 – The Rolling Stones start their second US tour.
October 25 – The Rolling Stones perform on The Ed Sullivan Show for the first time.
October 29 – The T.A.M.I. Show is filmed.
October 31 – The Supremes reach #1 on the Billboard Hot 100 chart with the second of five successive number one hits, "Baby Love".
November – A deal with U.K. impresario W. H. Miller lands the Anita Kerr Quartette on Capitol Records for North America.
December 11 – Sam Cooke is killed under mysterious circumstances in Los Angeles, California. Shortly thereafter, "A Change Is Gonna Come", a song considered by many to be his best, is released.
December 19 – The Supremes reach #1 on the Billboard Hot 100 chart with the third of five successive number one hits, "Come See About Me".
December 24  – The Beatles gain the Christmas number one in the United Kingdom for the second year running with I Feel Fine, which has topped the singles charts for the third week running. The Beatles have now had six number ones in the U.K. alone.
date unknown
Dalida is the first star to receive a Platinum Disc in Europe.
11-year-old Keith Green becomes the youngest person ever to sign a contract with the American Society of Composers, Authors and Publishers (ASCAP) after publishing, recording and releasing the song "The Way I Used to Be".
The National Institute of Kathak Dance is established in New Delhi.
Sonny and Cher begin performing together as "Caesar and Cleo".

Bands formed
See :Category:Musical groups established in 1964

Albums released

January

February

March

April

May

June

July

August

September

October

November

December

Release date unknown

442 Glenwood Avenue – The Pixies Three
The Academy Award-Winning "Call Me Irresponsible" and Other Hit Songs from the Movies – Andy Williams
Allan in Wonderland – Allan Sherman
Alexandria the Great – Lorez Alexandria
Amore Scusami – Dalida
Ballads, Blues and Boasters – Harry Belafonte
Basie Land – Count Basie
Beauty and the Beard – Al Hirt
Bebop Revisited! – Charles McPherson
Black Fire – Andrew Hill 
Blue Gene – Gene Pitney
Blue Spoon – Jimmy Witherspoon
Blue Around the Clock – Jimmy Witherspoon
Bo Diddley's 16 All-Time Greatest Hits – Bo Diddley
Bread & Butter – The Newbeats
Brown Sugar – Freddie Roach 
Christmas Cookin' – Jimmy Smith
Coltrane's Sound – John Coltrane
Cotton Candy – Al Hirt
Crescent – John Coltrane
Cuddlebug – The Simon Sisters
The Dealers – John Coltrane & Mal Waldron
Donna The Prima Donna – Dion DiMucci
The Door Is Still Open to My Heart – Dean Martin
The Dubliners – The Dubliners (debut)
Early Dawg - David Grisman
Ella at Juan-Les-Pins – Ella Fitzgerald
Ella Fitzgerald Sings the Johnny Mercer Song Book – Ella Fitzgerald
Etta James Rocks the House – Etta James
The Exciting Voice of Sergio Franchi – Sergio Franchi
Expressions East – John Berberian
For Swingin' Livers Only! – Allan Sherman
The Great Songs from "My Fair Lady" and Other Broadway Hits – Andy Williams
The Great Years – Johnny Mathis 
Here I Go Again – The Hollies (US)
Hey, Brother, Pour the Wine – Dean Martin
Hide and Seekers – The Seekers
How My Heart Sings! – Bill Evans
I'll Search My Heart and Other Great Hits – Johnny Mathis
Indifferentemente – Mario Trevi
In Europe – Miles Davis
In Love Again! – Peggy Lee
In Person at the Americana – Julie London
It Hurts to Be in Love – Gene Pitney
It's Monk's Time – Thelonious Monk
Johnny Horton's Greatest Hits – Johnny Horton
Joyful Season – Jo Stafford
Live at Birdland – John Coltrane
Love After Midnight – Patti Page
The Manfred Mann Album – Manfred Mann
Meet The Simon Sisters – The Simon Sisters
The Never Ending Impressions – The Impressions
Out to Lunch! – Eric Dolphy
Quincy Jones Explores the Music of Henry Mancini – Quincy Jones
 Right or Wrong – Ronnie Dove
Rock Around the Clock King – Bill Haley & His Comets
Runnin' Out of Fools – Aretha Franklin
Said I To Shostakovitch – Tupper Saussy 
Sammy Davis Jr. Salutes the Stars of the London Palladium – Sammy Davis, Jr. 
The Seekers – The Seekers 
A Session with The Dave Clark Five – The Dave Clark Five April 1964
The Shelter of Your Arms – Sammy Davis, Jr. 
Sinatra Sings Days of Wine and Roses, Moon River, and Other Academy Award Winners – Frank Sinatra 
Só Danço Samba – Clare Fischer
Sugar Lips – Al Hirt
Surf Surf Surf – Bill Haley & His Comets
The Swinger's Guide to Mary Poppins – The Tupper Saussy Quartet with Charlie McCoy
Tears for Dolphy – Ted Curson 
Tender Is the Night – Johnny Mathis  January 23, 1964
This Is Love – Johnny Mathis  September 18, 1964
Today, Tomorrow, Forever – Nancy Wilson May 1964
The Ventures in Space – The Ventures January 25, 1964
We Get Requests – The Oscar Peterson trio December 1964
Women in My Life – Sergio Franchi
The Wonderful World of Andy Williams – Andy Williams
The Wonderful World of Make Believe – Johnny Mathis

Biggest hit singles
The following singles achieved the highest chart positions in 1964.

Other significant singles

Published popular music

 "The Addams Family theme song" w.m. Vic Mizzy
 "Baby, I Need Your Loving w.m. Edward Holland, Brian Holland & Lamont Dozier
 "The Ballad of Gilligan's Island" w.m. Frank DeVol and Sherwood Schwartz
 "Before the Parade Passes By" w.m. Jerry Herman, from the musical Hello, Dolly!
 "Bewitched theme song" w.m. Howard Greenfield and Jack Keller
 "Chapel Of Love" w.m. Phil Spector, Ellie Greenwich & Jeff Barry
 "Chim Chim Cher-ee"  w.m. Richard M. Sherman and Robert B. Sherman
 "Cryin' Time" w.m. Buck Owens
 "Dear Heart" w. Jay Livingston & Ray Evans m. Henry Mancini
 "Feed the Birds" w.m. Richard M. Sherman & Robert B. Sherman introduced by Julie Andrews in the film Mary Poppins
 "Gimme Some" w. Lee Adams m. Charles Strouse
 "Glad All Over" w.m. Dave Clark & Mike Smith
 "Goin' Out of My Head" w.m. Teddy Randazzo & Bobby Weinstein
 "Golden Boy" w. Lee Adams m. Charles Strouse
 "Hang on Sloopy" w.m. Bert Russell & Wes Farrell
 "Have I the Right?" w.m. Ken Howard & Alan Blaikley
 "A House Is Not a Home" w. Hal David m. Burt Bacharach from the film A House Is Not a Home.  Recorded by Dionne Warwick.
 "Hush, Hush Sweet Charlotte", m. Frank DeVol from the film of the same name
 "I Will Wait For You" m. Michel Legrand.  From the film musical The Umbrellas of Cherbourg
 "If I Were a Rich Man"  w. Sheldon Harnick m. Jerry Bock. Introduced in the musical Fiddler on the Roof by Zero Mostel. Performed by Chaim Topol in the 1971 film version.
 "Invisible Tears" w.m. Ned Miller and Sue Miller
 "It's Over"  w.m. Roy Orbison & Bill Dees
 "The Joker"  w.m. Anthony Newley & Leslie Bricusse from the musical The Roar of the Greasepaint - The Smell of the Crowd
 "Let's Go Fly a Kite" w.m. Richard M. Sherman & Robert B. Sherman from the film Mary Poppins
 "Oh, Pretty Woman" w.m. Roy Orbison & Bill Dees
 "Pass Me By" w. Carolyn Leigh m. Cy Coleman. Introduced by Digby Wolfe in the film Father Goose
 "Put On Your Sunday Clothes" w.m. Jerry Herman, from the musical Hello, Dolly!
 "Sister Suffragette" w.m. Richard M. Sherman & Robert B. Sherman.  Introduced by Glynis Johns in the film Mary Poppins.
 "So Long, Dearie" w.m. Jerry Herman, from the musical Hello, Dolly!
 "A Spoonful of Sugar" w.m. Richard M. Sherman & Robert B. Sherman from the film Mary Poppins
 "Style" w. Sammy Cahn m. Jimmy Van Heusen from the film Robin And The Seven Hoods
 "Sunrise, Sunset" w. Sheldon Harnick m. Jerry Bock
 "Supercalifragilisticexpialidocious" w.m. Richard M. Sherman & Robert B. Sherman from the film Mary Poppins
 "That's Life" w.m. Dean Kay & Kelly Gordon
 "Tradition" w. Sheldon Harnick m. Jerry Bock
 "Where Did Our Love Go?" w.m. Lamont Dozier, Brian Holland and Edward Holland
 "A World Without Love" w.m. John Lennon and Paul McCartney
 "Zorbas" (Zorba's Dance) m. Mikis Theodorakis

Other notable songs
"Dahil Sa Iyo" w.m. Tom Spinosa and Mike Velarde, Jr.
"I miei pensieri" w. Sanzio Chiesa m. Giovanni Pelli
"Laisse tomber les filles" w.m. Serge Gainsbourg
"L'Orange" w.m. Gilbert Bécaud and Pierre Delanoë
"Mon Pays" w.m. Gilles Vigneault
"There's a Great Big Beautiful Tomorrow" w.m. Robert B. Sherman and Richard M. Sherman (for Walt Disney's Carousel of Progress)
"It's A Small World (After All)" w.m. Robert B. Sherman and Richard M. Sherman
"Que C'est Triste Venise" w.m. Françoise Dorin

Classical music

Premieres

Compositions
Gilbert Amy
Alpha-beth, for flute, oboe, clarinet, bass clarinet, bassoon, and horn
Cahiers d'épigrammes, for piano
Eyvin Andersen – Concerto for violin and orchestra
Jurriaan Andriessen – After the Fall, incidental music
Louis Andriessen
A Flower Song II, for oboe
A Flower Song III, for cello
Ittrospezione III, for two pianos and three instrumental groups,
Sweet, for alto recorder
Malcolm Arnold
Pieces (5), for violin and piano, Op. 84
Sinfonietta No. 3, for orchestra, Op. 81
A Sunshine Overture, for orchestra, Op. 83
Water Music, for winds and percussion, Op. 82
Milton Babbitt
Ensembles for Synthesizer, for four-track tape
Philomel, for soprano and four-track tape
Samuel Barber
Chorale for Ascension Day, for chorus, brass, timpani, and organ (ad lib.)
Night Flight, for orchestra, Op.19a,
Luciano Berio
Chemins I on Sequenza II, for harp and orchestra
 Folk Songs, for soprano and seven instruments
Rounds, for voice and harpsichord (subsequently withdrawn)
Traces, for soprano, mezzo-soprano, two actors, chorus, and orchestra (subsequently withdrawn)
Harrison Birtwistle
Entr'actes and Sappho Fragments, for soprano, flute, oboe, violin, viola, harp, and percussion
Three Movements with Fanfares, for chamber orchestra
Rob du Bois
Deuxième série de rondeaux, for piano four-hands and optional percussion
Just Like a Little Sonata, for piano
Pastorale VI, for piano
Pastorale VII, for alto recorder
Quartet, for oboe, violin, violin, and cello (revised version)
Benjamin Britten
Cadenza for Haydn's Cello Concerto in C major
Suite No. 1 for cello solo, Op. 72
Symphony for Cello and Orchestra, op. 68 (revised version)
Earle Brown – Corroboree, for three or two pianos
Carlos Chávez
Concerto for four horns and orchestra (revision)
Fuga HAGC, for violin, viola, cello, and contrabass
Resonancias, for orchestra
Tambuco, for six percussionists
Aaron Copland
Down a Country Lane, for school orchestra
Emblems, for symphonic band
Music for a Great City
George Crumb – Four Nocturnes (Night Music II) for violin and piano
Luigi Dallapiccola
Parole di San Paolo, for mezzo-soprano or boy's voice and 11 instruments
Quattro liriche di Antonio Machado, version for soprano and chamber orchestra
Mario Davidovsky
Electronic Study No. 3
Synchronisms No. 2 for flute, clarinet, violin, cello and tape
Synchronisms No. 3 for cello and electronic sound
Peter Maxwell Davies
Little Pieces (5), for piano
Second Fantasia on John Taverner's In Nomine, for orchestra
Shakespeare Music, for 11 instruments
Michel Decoust – Horizon remarquable (lyrics by René Char)
David Diamond
The Martyr for male choir (revised version)
"My Papa's Waltz", for voice and piano
"Prayer", for voice and piano
String Quartet No. 8
Symphony No. 5
We Two, song cycle, voice and piano
Andrzej Dobrowolski – Music for Strings and Four Groups of Wind Instruments
Henri Dutilleux – Métaboles
Morton Feldman
The King of Denmark, for percussion solo
Numbers, for flute, horn, trombone, tuba, percussion, celesta, piano, violin, and contrabass
Piano Piece
Vertical Thoughts IV, for piano
Wolfgang Fortner
Epigramme, for piano
Minne, cantata for tenor and guitar
Zyklus, for cello and piano
Gara Garayev
Symphony No. 3
Roberto Gerhard
The Anger of Achilles, incidental music
Macbeth, incidental music
Alberto Ginastera
Bomarzo cantata, for tenor or baritone, narrator, and chamber orchestra, Op. 32
Don Rodrigo Symphony, for soprano and orchestra, Op. 31a
Alexander Goehr
Five Poems and an Epigram of William Blake, for chorus and trumpet, Op. 17
Pieces (3), for piano, Op. 18
Karel Goeyvaerts – Stuk voor piano en tape
Fernando Lopes Graça
Canciones (4), for voice and chamber orchestra (revised version)
Prelúdio, capricho e galope, for violin and piano (second revision)
Romances, for voice and piano
Sonnets (4), for voice and piano
String Quartet No. 1
Ferde Grofé – World's Fair Suite
Alois Hába
String Quartet No. no.15, Op. 95, in -tones
Suite, for bass clarinet solo, Op. 96
Roy Harris
Epilogue to Profiles in Courage–JFK, for orchestra
Etudes for Pedals, for organ
Fantasy, for organ, brass, and timpani
Horn of Plenty, for orchestra
Jubilate for Worship (Alleluia), for SATB choir, brass, piano, and percussion
Salute to Youth, for orchestra
Sonata, for cello and piano
Hans Werner Henze
Chor gefangener Trojer, for chorus and orchestra (revised version)
Divertimenti, for two pianos
Der Frieden, incidental music
Ein Landarzt, opera in one-act (revised from the 1951 radio opera version)
Lieder von einer Insel, for chamber chorus, trombone, two cellos, contrabass, chamber organ, percussion, and timpani
Sinfonische Etüden (3), for orchestra (revised version)
Tancredi, ballet, for orchestra
Zwischenspiele (from Der junge Lord), for orchestra
Alan Hovhaness
Bagatelles (4), for string quartet, Op. 30
Floating World "Ukiyo", for orchestra, Op. 209
Haiku (3), for piano, op. 113
Meditation on Zeami, for orchestra, Op. 207
Sonata, for flute solo, Op. 118
Sonata, for 2 oboes and organ, Op. 130 (revised version)
String Quartet no.3, Op. 208, No. 1
String Quartet no. 4, Op. 208, No. 2
Variations and Fugue, for orchestra, Op. 18
Kan Ishii – Otokonoko ga umarete (男の子が生まれて), for male chorus
Maki Ishii – Gallow Songs (絞首台の歌; Galgenlieder) for baritone, male chorus and ensemble
Wojciech Kilar – Diphthongos for mixed choir and orchestra
Włodzimierz Kotoński
Monochromia, for oboe solo
Pezzo, for flute and piano
Wind Quintet
György Ligeti – Fragment, for ten instruments (revised version)
David Lumsdaine – Annotations of Auschwitz (cantata with words by Peter Porter)
Witold Lutosławski – String Quartet
Bruno Maderna
Aria da Hyperion, for soprano, flute, and orchestra
Dimensioni IV, for flute, picccolo, alto flute, bass flute, and chamber orchestra
Yoritsune Matsudaira
Chamber Concerto, for harpsichord and harp
Concerto No. 1 for piano and orchestra
Toshirō Mayuzumi
Campanology Olympica, electronic music
Ongaku no tanjō, for orchestra
Raihai jokyoku, for orchestra
Olivier Messiaen
Et exspecto resurrectionem mortuorum, for 34 wind instruments and 3 percussionists
Prélude, for piano
Darius Milhaud
Adam, for soprano, 2 tenors, and 2 baritones, Op. 411
Adieu (cantata), for voice, flute, viola, and harp, Op. 410
L'amour chanté, for voice and piano, Op. 409
Concerto for harpsichord and orchestra, Op. 407
Septet, for 2 violins, 2 violas, 2 cellos, and contrabass, Op. 408
İlhan Mimaroğlu
Agony, for magnetic tape
Le Tombeau d'Edgar A. Poe, for magnetic tape
Intermezzo, for magnetic tape
Bowery Bum, for magnetic tape
Makoto Moroi
Pieces (5), for shakuhachi
Toccata, Sarabande, and Tarantella, for piano and two string orchestras
Bo Nilsson – La bran, for chorus and orchestra
Luigi Nono
Da un diario italiano, for two choruses
La fabbrica illuminata, for mezzo-soprano and tape
Juan Orrego-Salas
Concerto, for winds, Op. 53
Sonata, for violin and piano, op. 9 (revised version)
Sonata a 4 (Edgewood Sonata), for flute, oboe, harpsichord, and contrabass, Op.  55
Luis de Pablo – Escena, for SATB choir, strings, and percussion
Arvo Pärt
Collage über B-A-C-H, oboe, harpsichord, piano, and strings
Diagramme, for piano, Op.11
Musica sillabica, for 12 instruments, Op. 12
Quintettino, for wind quintet
Juan Carlos Paz
Concreción 1964, for flute, clarinet, bassoon, horn, trumpet, trombone, and tuba
Galaxia 64, for organ
Música para piano y orquesta
Krzysztof Penderecki
Cantata in honorem Almae Matris Universitatis Iagellonicae sescentos abhinc annos fundatae, for 2 choruses, contrabassoon, brass, percussion, piano, and organ
Pieśń żałobna ku czci B. Rutkowskiego, for chorus
Sonata, for cello and orchestra
Vincent Persichetti
Cummings Choruses (4), for two voices and piano, Op. 98
Introit, for string orchestra, Op. 96
Winter Cantata (11 Haiku), for four-part women's choir, flute, and marimba, Op. 97
Goffredo Petrassi
Concerto for Orchestra No. 7
Sesto non-senso, for a cappella choir
Tre per sette, for piccolo (+ flute + alto flute), oboe (+ English horn), E clarinet (+ clarinet)
Walter Piston
Quartet for violin, viola, cello, and piano
Sextet for strings
Terry Riley – In C
Hilding Rosenberg – Sönerna (Cain and Abel), ballet, for orchestra
Ahmed Adnan Saygun –  Ten Etudes on "Aksak" Rhythms, for piano
R. Murray Schafer – Statement in Blue, for youth orchestra
Dieter Schnebel
Compositio, for orchestra (revised version)
Concert sans orchestre (réactions 2), for piano and audience
William Schuman – Amaryllis Variations, for string trio
Dmitri Shostakovich
String Quartet No. 9 in E-flat major, Op. 117
String Quartet No. 10 in A-flat major, Op. 118
Karlheinz Stockhausen
Mikrophonie I
Mixtur for five orchestra groups, sine-wave generators, and ring modulators
Igor Stravinsky
Elegy for J.F.K., for baritone or mezzo-soprano and 3 clarinets
Fanfare for a New Theatre, for two trumpets
Tōru Takemitsu
Blue Aurora for Toshi Ichiyanagi, theatre piece
Ichinotani monogatari, incidental music
Natsukashino San Francisco, for tape
James Tenney – Music for Player Piano
Mikis Theodorakis – Axion Esti
Virgil Thomson
Autumn, concertino for harp, strings, and percussion
Auvergnat Folk Songs (5), for SATB choir and orchestra
The Feast of Love, for baritone and orchestra
Pilgrims and Pioneers, for band
When I Survey the Bright Celestial Sphere, for unison voices and organ or piano
Iannis Xenakis
Eonta, for two trumpets, three trombones, and piano
Hiketides: les suppliates d'Eschyle, for 50 female voices and 10 instruments or orchestra
La Monte Young
Bowed Mortar Relays, action work, realization of Composition 1960 no. 9
Eat (music for the film by Andy Warhol), for tape
Haircut (music for the film by Andy Warhol), for tape
Kiss (music for the film by Andy Warhol), for tape
Prelude to The Tortoise, for voices, various instruments, and electronic drones
Sleep (music for the film by Andy Warhol), for tape
The Tortoise Droning Selected Pitches from The Holy Numbers for The Two Black Tigers, The Green Tiger and The Hermit, for voices, various instruments, and electronic drones
The Tortoise Recalling The Drone of The Holy Numbers as They Were Revealed in the Dreams of The Whirlwind and The Obsidian Gong and Illuminated by The Sawmill, The Green Sawtooth Ocelot and The High-Tension Line Stepdown Transformer, for voices, various instruments, and electronic drones
The Well-Tuned Piano
Joji Yuasa – Projection Esemplastic with White Noise, electronic music
Bernd Alois Zimmermann
Monologue, for two pianos
Un petit rien, for small orchestra

Opera
Jurriaan Andriessen – Het zwarte blondje
Samuel Barber – Vanessa (revised version)
Benjamin Britten – Curlew River (church parable)
Alberto Ginastera – Don Rodrigo, op. 31
Bruno Maderna – Hyperion
Gian Carlo Menotti – Martin's Lie
Joaquín Rodrigo – El hijo fingido (zarzuela)
Robert Ward – The Lady from Colorado

Jazz

Musical theater
 Hello, Dolly! (Jerry Herman) – Broadway production opened at the St. James Theatre on January 16 and ran for 2844 performances
 What Makes Sammy Run? – Broadway production opened at the 54th Street Theater on February 27 and ran for 540 performances
 Funny Girl (Jule Styne and Bob Merrill) – Broadway production opened at the Winter Garden Theatre on March 26 and ran for 1348 performances
 Anyone Can Whistle – Broadway production opened at the Majestic Theatre on April 4 and ran for 9 performances
 Fiddler on the Roof (Jerry Bock and Sheldon Harnick) – Broadway production opened at the Imperial Theatre on September 22 and ran for 3242 performances
 Foxy Book: Ian McLellan Hunter & Ring Lardner, Jr. Lyrics: Johnny Mercer Music: Robert Emmett Dolan.  Broadway production opened on February 16 and ran for 72 performances. Starring Bert Lahr, Larry Blyden, Cathryn Damon and Julienne Marie.
 Golden Boy – Broadway production opened at the Majestic Theatre on October 20 and ran for 569 performances
 She Loves Me – London production opened at the Lyric Theatre on April 29 and ran for 189 performances
 Maggie May London production opened at the Adelphi Theatre on September 22 and ran for 501 performances
 Robert and Elizabeth – London production opened at the Lyric Theatre on October 20 and ran for 948 performances
 Little Me, the musical – London production opened at the Cambridge Theatre on November 18 and ran for 334 performances
 Salad Days (Julian Slade) – London revival

Musical films
 Ayee Milan Ki Bela, with music by Shankar Jaikishan
 Dosti, starring Sanjay Khan, with music by Laxmikant–Pyarelal
 A Hard Day's Night starring The Beatles
 Mary Poppins starring Julie Andrews, Dick Van Dyke, Glynis Johns and David Tomlinson
 My Fair Lady starring Rex Harrison and Audrey Hepburn
 Robin and the 7 Hoods starring Frank Sinatra, Bing Crosby, Dean Martin and Sammy Davis, Jr.
 The Umbrellas of Cherbourg (Les Parapluies de Cherbourg)
 The Unsinkable Molly Brown starring Debbie Reynolds and Harve Presnell
 Viva Las Vegas starring Elvis Presley and Ann-Margret

Births
January 5 – Grant Young, alternative rock drummer (Soul Asylum)
January 10 – Brad Roberts, folk-rock singer and guitarist (Crash Test Dummies)
January 11 – Torstein Aagaard-Nilsen, composer
January 15 – Osmo Tapio Räihälä, composer
January 18 – Patrick Esposito Di Napoli, Canadian musician (d. 1994) 
January 19 – Ricardo Arjona, Guatemalan singer-songwriter
January 29 – Roddy Frame, Scottish new wave singer-songwriter (Aztec Camera)
January 30 – Marcel Jacob, Swedish rock bassist Talisman (d. 2009)
January 31 – Jeff Hanneman, American rock guitarist (Slayer) (d. 2013)
February 1 – Jani Lane, American singer-songwriter and guitarist (Warrant and Saints of the Underground) (d. 2011)
February 4 – Noodles of The Offspring
February 5 – Duff McKagan (Guns N' Roses  Velvet Revolver)
February 6 - Gord Downie, Canadian rock singer-songwriter, musician, writer and activist. (D. 2017) 
February 23 
John Norum, Europe guitarist
Eizo Sakamoto, Japanese musician, singer and songwriter (Anthem and Animetal)  
March 1 – Clinton Gregory, American country and bluegrass singer
March 11 – Vinnie Paul, drummer (Pantera, Damageplan)
March 18
 Courtney Pine, British-born jazz saxophonist
Rozalla, Zambian-born electronic music performer
March 19 – Yoko Kanno, composer
March 20 – Natacha Atlas, Belgian singer
March 30 – Tracy Chapman, American singer-songwriter
April 5 – Princess Erika, French singer
April 6 – David Woodard, American conductor and writer
April 7 – Russell Crowe, New Zealand-born Australian actor and singer
April 8 – Biz Markie, American rapper (d. 2021)
April 11 – Steve Azar, American country music singer-songwriter
April 12 – Amy Ray American musician (Indigo Girls)
April 16
Dave Pirner (Soul Asylum)
Esbjörn Svensson Swedish jazz pianist (d. 2008)
April 17 – Maynard James Keenan (Tool)
April 18 – Bez, British dancer
April 24 – Augusta Read Thomas, American composer
April 25
Andy Bell, singer (Erasure)
Kenji Yamamoto, Japanese video game composer
April 30 – Kent James, American singer-songwriter
May 10
 Mark Andre, French-born German composer
 Orna Datz, Israeli singer, actress and television presenter
May 14 – Gordon Duncan, bagpiper, low-whistle player and composer (d. 2005)
May 26 – Lenny Kravitz, American singer-songwriter, producer and guitarist
May 30
Wynonna Judd, American country singer
Tom Morello, American rock guitarist (Rage Against the Machine, Audioslave, The Nightwatchman)
May 31 
Darryl McDaniels (Run-D.M.C.)
Frost
June 3 – Kerry King, American rock guitarist (Slayer)
June 6 – Jay Bentley (Bad Religion)
June 10 – Jimmy Chamberlin, American rock musician (The Smashing Pumpkins)
June 13 – Robbie Merrill (Godsmack)
June 22
Dicky Barrett (The Mighty Mighty Bosstones)
Mike Edwards (Jesus Jones)
June 29 – Stedman Pearson, British R&B singer (Five Star)
June 19 – Brian Vander Ark, American singer-songwriter, guitarist and actor (The Verve Pipe)
July 9 – Courtney Love, American singer, songwriter, actress and visual artist (Hole, Pagan Babies (band)) 
July 13 
Brent Fischer, American composer, arranger, bandleader, bass guitarist and percussionist
Paul Thorn, American singer-songwriter and guitarist
July 17 – Craig Morgan, American singer-songwriter and guitarist
July 19 – Masahiko Kondō, Japanese singer
July 20 – Chris Cornell (Soundgarden & Audioslave) (d. 2017)
July 22 – Will Calhoun (Living Colour)
July 23 – Nick Menza, German drummer and songwriter (Megadeth and Memorain)
July 27 – Rex Brown, American musician and author (Pantera)  
July 30 - Alek Keshishian, American film and commercial director, writer, producer and music video director (Selena Gomez, Madonna) 
July 31 
C.C. Catch, Dutch-born German singer
Jim Corr, Irish singer and musician (The Corrs)
August 1 – Adam Duritz (Counting Crows)
August 3 – Lucky Dube, South African reggae musician (d. 2007)
August 5 – Adam Yauch (Beastie Boys) (d. 2012)
August 6 – Gary Valenciano, Filipino musician
August 8 – Jan Josef Liefers, German actor, producer, director and musician  
August 17 – Colin James, Canadian singer-songwriter
September 2 - Keanu Reeves, Canadian-American actor and musician.
September 3 – Junaid Jamshed, Pakistani singer-songwriter and guitarist (Vital Signs) (d. 2016)  
September 7 – Eazy-E (NWA) (d. 1995)
September 11 – Victor Wooten, American bassist
September 23 – Koshi Inaba, Japanese rock singer (B'z)
September 26 – Nicki French, British singer
September 27 – Stephan Jenkins, American rock singer (Third Eye Blind)
September 30
Trey Anastasio, American musician
Robby Takac, Goo Goo Dolls
October 4 – Francis Magalona, Filipino rapper (d. 2009)
October 5 – Dave Dededer, Presidents of the United States of America
October 6 – Matthew Sweet, rock musician
October 7 – Sam Brown, singer, daughter of Joe Brown
October 10 – Neneh Cherry, singer
October 20
Frederic Chiu, pianist
Luciano, reggae singer
Jim Sonefeld (Hootie & The Blowfish)
October 22 – Toby McKeehan, American musician
October 23 – Robert Trujillo (Metallica)
October 30 – Silvano Monasterios, pianist and composer
November 6
Corey Glover (Living Colour)
Greg Graffin (Bad Religion)
November 12
Vic Chesnutt, American singer-songwriter and guitarist (brute. and The Undertow Orchestra) (d. 2009)
David Ellefson, American bass player and songwriter (Megadeth, Avian and F5)
November 14
Joseph Simmons (Run-D.M.C.)
Nic Dalton (The Lemonheads)
November 16 – Diana Krall, Canadian jazz pianist and singer
November 24 – Tony Rambola (Godsmack)
November 25 – Mark Lanegan, American rock singer (Screaming Trees) (d. 2022)
 November 30 Miljenko Matijevic
December 8 – Teri Hatcher, American actress, voice-actress, writer, singer, YouTuber, dancer and cheerleader
December 9 – Paul Landers, German rock musician (Rammstein)
December 11  
Justin Currie, Scottish singer-songwriter and guitarist (Del Amitri and The Uncle Devil Show)
Dave Schools, American singer-songwriter, bass player and producer (Widespread Panic, Stockholm Syndrome and J Mascis + The Fog)
Cosy Sheridan, American singer-songwriter
December 13 – Hideto Matsumoto (Hide), Japanese rock musician (d. 1998)
December 23 – Eddie Vedder, American rock singer (Pearl Jam)
December 28 – Malcolm Gets, American actor and dancer
date unknown 
 Kyaw Kyaw Naing, Burmese traditional musician
 Michael Haussman, American artist, writer, producer and director of motion pictures, television advertisements and music videos
 Nitin Sawhney, British Indian musician, producer and composer

Deaths
January 7 – Colin McPhee, Canadian composer and musicologist, 63
January 9 – Big Boy Goudie, jazz saxophonist,
January 15 – Jack Teagarden, jazz trombonist and vocalist, 58 (pneumonia/heart attack)
January 22 – Marc Blitzstein, composer, 58
January 27 – Leib Glantz, musicologist, 65
February 25 – Johnny Burke, lyricist, 55
March 8 – Renata Borgatti, Italian pianist, 69 or 70
March 27 – Emil Reesen, Danish composer, conductor and pianist, 76
April 4 – Georgia Caine, Broadway star, 87
May 10 – Carol Haney, dancer and choreographer, 39 (pneumonia)
May 24 – Gali Penchala Narasimha Rao, film composer
June 10 – Louis Gruenberg, pianist and composer, 79
June 29 – Eric Dolphy, American jazz saxophonist, flautist and bass clarinettist, 36 (diabetic coma)
July 1 – Pierre Monteux, French conductor, 89
July 4 – Hank Sylvern, U.S. organist, composer and radio personality, 56
July 10 – Joe Haymes, bandleader and arranger, 57 (heart failure)
July 31 – Jim Reeves, American country singer, 40 (plane crash)
August 9 – Chucho Monge, Mexican songwriter, 53
August 14 – Johnny Burnette, rockabilly singer, 30 (drowned)
September 14 – Mary Howe, composer and pianist, 82
September 20 – Lazare Lévy, French pianist and teacher, 82
September 28
Nacio Herb Brown, songwriter and film/TV composer, 68
George Dyson, English composer, 81
Harpo Marx, American comedian and musician, 75
October 10
Eddie Cantor, comedian, singer and songwriter, 72
Heinrich Neuhaus, Soviet (of German extraction) pianist and teacher, 76
October 15 – Cole Porter, songwriter and composer, 73
October 29 – Vasily Agapkin, Soviet composer
November 5 – Buddy Cole, jazz pianist and orchestra leader, 45 (heart attack)
November 30 – Don Redman, US arranger, bandleader and saxophonist
December 2 – Sam H. Stept, Russian-born US songwriter, pianist and conductor, 67
December 9 – Edith Sitwell, poet and collaborator of William Walton
December 11
Alma Mahler, songwriter and widow of Gustav Mahler
Sam Cooke, singer, 33 (shot)
December 14 – Francisco Canaro, Uruguayan violinist and tango orchestra leader, 76
December 21 – Theodor Blumer, composer and conductor, 83

Awards

Grammy Awards
Grammy Awards of 1964

Eurovision Song Contest
Eurovision Song Contest 1964

See also
Other events of 1964
Hot 100 No. 1 Hits of 1964,
1963 in music
1965 in music
Other 'years in music'

References

 
20th century in music
Music by year